Cheyenne is a lost 1929 American silent Western film directed by Albert S. Rogell and written by Bennett Cohen, Marion Jackson and Don Ryan. The film stars Ken Maynard, Gladys McConnell, James Bradbury Jr., Billy Franey and Slim Whitaker. The film was released by Warner Bros. on February 3, 1929.

Cast   
 Ken Maynard as Cal Roberts
 Gladys McConnell as Violet Wentworth
 James Bradbury Jr. as Slim
 Billy Franey as Judge Boggs 
 Slim Whitaker as Klaxton

References

External links
 

1929 films
1920s English-language films
1929 Western (genre) films
First National Pictures films
Warner Bros. films
Films directed by Albert S. Rogell
Lost American films
Lost Western (genre) films
American black-and-white films
1929 lost films
Silent American Western (genre) films
1920s American films